The Mercedes-Benz FO engine series is a family of naturally-aspirated V8 and V10 racing engines, designed, developed and produced by Mercedes, in partnership and collaboration with Ilmor, for Formula One, and used between  and . Over years of development, engine power managed to increase, from 690 @ 15,600 rpm, to later 930 hp @ 19,000 rpm. The customer engines were used by Sauber, McLaren, Brawn Grand Prix, and Force India.

List of Formula One engines

Applications

Sauber C13
McLaren MP4/10
McLaren MP4/11
McLaren MP4/12
McLaren MP4/13
McLaren MP4/14
McLaren MP4/15
McLaren MP4-16
McLaren MP4-17
McLaren MP4-18
McLaren MP4-19
McLaren MP4-20
McLaren MP4-21
McLaren MP4-22
McLaren MP4-23
McLaren MP4-24
McLaren MP4-25
McLaren MP4-26
McLaren MP4-27
McLaren MP4-28
Brawn BGP 001
Force India VJM02
Force India VJM03
Force India VJM04
Force India VJM05
Force India VJM06
Mercedes MGP W01
Mercedes MGP W02
Mercedes F1 W03
Mercedes F1 W04

Mercedes-Benz FO engine World Championship results
2 World Constructors' Championships.
4 World Drivers' Championships.
87 race wins.
76 pole positions.
260 podium finishes.

References

 
FO
Formula One engines
Engines by model
Gasoline engines by model
V10 engines
V8 engines